A Sister to Assist 'Er is a 1930 British  comedy film directed by George Dewhurst and starring Barbara Gott, Polly Emery and Donald Stuart. It was based on the play A Sister to Assist 'Er by John le Breton.

Cast
 Barbara Gott ...  Mrs. May 
 Polly Emery ...  Mrs. McNash 
 Donald Stuart ...  Alf 
 Muriel Aked ... Mrs. Crawley 
 Mary Brough ...  Mrs. May 
 Alec Hunter ...  Mr. McNash 
 Charles Paton ...  Thistlethwaite 
 Maud Gill ...  Miss Pilbeam 
 Johnny Butt ...  Sailor

References

External links

1930 films
British comedy films
Films directed by George Dewhurst
British films based on plays
1930 comedy films
British black-and-white films
1930s English-language films
1930s British films